Amirabad Cham Gaz (also Romanized as Amīrābād Cham Gaz; also known as Amīrābād) is a village in Teshkan Rural District, Chegeni District, Dowreh County, Lorestan Province, Iran. At the 2006 census, its population was 458, in 99 families.

References 

Towns and villages in Dowreh County